Gonzalo Rehak is an Argentine footballer who plays as a goalkeeper for Deportivo Maipú.

References

External links

1994 births
Living people
People from Quilmes Partido
Argentine people of Czech descent
Argentine footballers
Association football goalkeepers
Club Atlético Independiente footballers
Nueva Chicago footballers
Barracas Central players
Deportivo Maipú players
Argentine Primera División players
Sportspeople from Buenos Aires Province